On with the Dance may refer to:
 On with the Dance (Upstairs, Downstairs), an episode of the British TV series Upstairs, Downstairs
 On with the Dance (film), a 1920 American silent costume drama
 On with the Dance (musical), a 1925 musical revue